The Flanders U-boat flotillas were Imperial German Navy formations set up to prosecute the U-boat campaign against Allied shipping in the Western Approaches (British Home Waters) during the First World War. Originally operating as a flotilla, it was split in two during the latter part of the war.

The Flanders flotilla was constituted in March 1915 at the port of Bruges in occupied Belgium. Commanded by  Karl Bartenbach, the force comprised nine UB- and seven UC- type U-boats, small mass-produced coastal types suited for operations in the closed waters of the Channel and the North Sea. UB boats were prefabricated in Germany and brought in sections to Bruges and assembled. The boats used Zeebrugge and Ostend as exit ports; UC minelayers joined in late 1915. Throughout the campaign the Flotilla grew, though losses also remained high, as the unit bore a considerable proportion of the trade war  around the British coast. During 1916 12 boats were lost; in 1917 this rose to 29 boats, 9 UB- and 20 UC-type.
 
The 1st Flanders Flotilla, under K/L Walther, comprised 8 UB- and 12 UC- boats at its formation. during the next twelve months 10 UB- and 5 UC- boats were lost. With replacements the unit strength in 1918 was 16 UB- and 9 UC- boats. The 2nd Flanders Flotilla, led by K/L Rohrbeck, comprised 12 UB- and 12 UC- boats; 12 Ub- and 4 UC- boats were lost but with replacements its strength in 1918 was 17 UB- and 7 UC- boats. Towards the end of 1918 the base at Bruges was abandoned  as the German armies on the Western Front retreated. The surviving boats of the flotillas were surrendered at Harwich in November 1918.

Notes

References

 
 

U-boat flotillas
Military units and formations of the Imperial German Navy
Naval units and formations of Germany in World War I